Bertrand Blanc (born 29 October 1973) is a French ski mountaineer.

Blanc is born in Bourg-Saint-Maurice. He started ski mountaineering in 1992 and competed first at the Pierra Menta race in 1994. He has been member of the national team since 2000.

Selected results 
 2001:
 4th, European Championship team race (together with Cyril Champange)
 2002:
 4th, World Championship team race (together with Cyril Champange)
 7th, World Championship combination ranking
 2003:
 7th, European Championship team race (together with Cyril Champange)
 2005:
 4th, European Championship team race (together with Vincent Meilleur)
 4th, European Championship relay race (together with Florent Perrier, Grégory Gachet and Tony Sbalbi)
 8th, European Championship single race
 2007:
 3rd, European Championship relay race (together with Yannick Buffet, Tony Sbalbi and Fabien Anselmet)
 7th, European Championship team race (together with Yannick Buffet)

Pierra Menta 

 1999: 10th, together with Cyril Champange
 2000: 9th, together with Cyril Champange
 2001: 6th, together with Cyril Champange
 2002: 5th, together with Cyril Champange
 2003: 4th, together with Cyril Champange
 2004: 7th, together with Cyril Champange
 2006: 5th, together with Vincent Meilleur
 2007: 3rd, together with Alexandre Pellicier

Trofeo Mezzalama 

 2003: 7th, together with Grégory Gachet and Cyril Champange

Patrouille des Glaciers 

 2008: 2nd, together with Florent Perrier and Grégory Gachet

External links
 Bertrand Blanc at skimountaineering.org

1973 births
Living people
French male ski mountaineers
People from Bourg-Saint-Maurice
Sportspeople from Savoie